Nenad Borovčanin (Serbian Cyrillic: Ненад Боровчанин; born 25 March 1979) is a Serbian boxer.

He is the current interim WBO European Cruiserweight boxing champion. His head coach is Miroslav Borovčanin (from 2006.).

References

1979 births
Cruiserweight boxers
Living people
Serbian male boxers
Serbian people of Bosnia and Herzegovina descent